Battle of Khankala may refer to:

 Battle of Khankala (1807), taking of the Khankala fortification by Russian forces
 Battle of Khankala (1994), failed attempt by the Chechen separatists to counterattack at Khankala